This is a list of television shows formerly broadcast on the Kids' WB programming block in the United States. The block launched on September 9, 1995, on The WB and continued after the 2006 United States broadcast TV realignment on The CW until it aired for the final time on May 17, 2008. Kids' WB would be succeeded by The CW4Kids.

Former programming

Original programming

Warner Bros. Animation

Warner Bros. Television

Programming from Cartoon Network

Cartoon Network Studios

Warner Bros. Animation

Programming from Fox Kids

Programming from Hanna-Barbera
 Captain Planet (1997–1998)
 The New Scooby-Doo Movies (2002)
 Scooby-Doo, Where Are You! (2002–2004)
 The Scooby-Doo Show (2002–2003)
 Scooby-Doo and Scrappy-Doo (2002–2003)
 The New Scooby and Scrappy-Doo Show (2002–2003)

Programming from 4Kids Entertainment
 Pokémon (1999–2006) (first 8 seasons only dubbed by 4Kids Entertainment) 
 Pokémon: Indigo League (1999)
 Pokémon: Adventures in the Orange Islands (1999–2000)
 Pokémon: The Johto Journeys (2000–2001)
 Pokémon: Johto League Champions (2001–2002)
 Pokémon: Master Quest (2002–2003)
 Pokémon: Advanced (2003–2004)
 Pokémon: Advanced Challenge (2004–2005)
 Pokémon: Advanced Battle (2005–2006)
 Yu-Gi-Oh! † ‡ (2001–2006)
 Cubix: Robots for EveryoneE/I † ‡ (2001–2003)

Syndicated from Sony Pictures Television/Adelaide Productions
 Channel Umptee-3 (1997–1998)
 Men in Black: The Series (1997–2001)
 Generation O! (2000–2001)
 Jackie Chan Adventures (2000–2005)
 Max Steel (2000–2001)
 Phantom Investigators (2002)
 The Spectacular Spider-Man † (2008; in conjunction with Marvel Entertainment)

Syndicated from WildBrain
 Spider Riders (2006–2007; produced by Cookie Jar Entertainment)
 Magi-NationE/I † (2007–2008; produced by Cookie Jar Entertainment)
 Will and DewittE/I † (2007–2008; produced by Cookie Jar Entertainment)
 World of Quest † (2008; produced by Cookie Jar Entertainment)

Acquired programming
 Earthworm Jim (1995–1996; produced by Universal Animation Studios)
 The Legend of Calamity Jane (1997)
 Brats of the Lost Nebula (1998; in conjunction with Jim Henson's Creature Shop)
 Invasion America (1998; produced by DreamWorks Television Animation)
 X-Men: Evolution (2000–2003; in conjunction with Marvel Entertainment)
 Cardcaptors (2000–2001; produced by Nelvana)
 Dragon Ball Z (2001)
 The Mummy (2001–2003; produced by Universal Animation Studios)
 Rescue HeroesE/I ‡ (2001–2003)
 Sailor Moon (2001)
 MegaMan NT Warrior (2003–2005)
 Da Boom Crew (2004)
 Astro Boy (2004)
 Transformers: Cybertron (2005)
 Viewtiful Joe (2005–2006)
 Monster Allergy (2006–2007)
 Eon Kid † (2007–2008)
 Skunk Fu! † (2007–2008)

Shorts
Thumb Wrestling Federation (2007–2008)

† - Program transitioned to The CW4Kids
‡ - Program transitioned to Vortexx

Notes

References